Solonghello is a comune (municipality) in the Province of Alessandria in the Italian region Piedmont, located about  east of Turin and about  northwest of Alessandria.

Solonghello borders the following municipalities: Camino, Mombello Monferrato, Pontestura, and Serralunga di Crea.

Demographic evolution

References

Cities and towns in Piedmont